The Dells of the Wisconsin River, also called the Wisconsin Dells (from Old English “dæle”, modern English “dale”), meaning “valley”, is a 5-mile (8-km) gorge on the Wisconsin River in south-central Wisconsin, USA. It is noted for its scenic beauty, in particular for its unique Cambrian sandstone rock formations and tributary canyons. The formations are divided into the "Upper Dells" and the "Lower Dells" by the Kilbourn Dam.

The cliffs, some over 100 feet (30 m) high, and side canyons are closed to the public to protect sensitive ecological features.  The viewing of the rock formations by water is a popular tourist attraction in the area. The nearby city of Wisconsin Dells is the center of summer tourist activity, much of it in the form of the theme parks unrelated to the river features.

The Dells of the Wisconsin River is owned by the Wisconsin Department of Natural Resources. It was established as a State Natural Area in 1994.

Description and formation

The Dells was formed during the Last Glacial Period approximately 15,000 years ago, although the rock itself is much older, dating from the Cambrian Period approximately 510–520 million years ago when the area of Wisconsin was at the bottom of a shallow sea.

Approximately 19,000 years ago, the Dells was at the extreme western margin of the continental glacier.  However, the Dells itself was never covered by glacial ice sheets – it was part of the large Driftless Area that was bypassed by the ice.  The melting of the glacier formed Glacial Lake Wisconsin, a lake about the size of Great Salt Lake in Utah and as deep as 150 feet (45 m).  The lake was held back by an ice dam of the remaining glacier.  The eventual bursting of the ice dam unleashed a catastrophic flood, dropping the lake's depth to 50 feet (15 m) and cutting deep, narrow gorges and unusual rock formations into the sandstone seen today.

Ecosystem
The area of the Dells provides a mixture of plant communities, including northern and southern oak, pine forests, as well as oak savanna, moist cliffs, and dry cliffs.

The cliffs provide unique niches for plants, some of which are very rare in Wisconsin, including:
Cliff cudweed (Gnaphalium obtusifolium var saxicola ), which is known in only two places on Earth – in the Dells and in the Kickapoo Valley, grows on protected rock ledges.
Lapland azalea (Rhododendron lapponicum)
Round-stemmed false foxglove (Agalinis gattingeri)
Maidenhair spleenwort (Asplenium trichomanes)
Fragrant fern (Dryopteris fragrans).

Among the rare animals in the dell are six dragonfly species, including the Royal river cruiser (Macromia taeniolata), six rare mussels and numerous species of birds.

Cultural history

The cultural history of the area stretches back several thousand years, from early Paleo-Indian people to the more recent Native American peoples, such as Ho-Chunk, Sac, and Menominee, who left behind effigy and burial mounds, camps and village sites, garden beds, and rock art.

The Dells were made famous in 1886 by the photographer H. H. Bennett, who took the first stop-action photo of his son jumping onto Stand Rock.

Protected status
The area is now owned by the Wisconsin Department of Natural Resources and was designated a State Natural Area in 1994.

See also
Ice Age Trail
Missoula Floods

References

Further reading
Miller, F. A. (1901). Kilbourn and the Dells of the Wisconsin, Chicago: Gen. Passenger Dept., Chicago, Milwaukee, & St. Paul Railway. (1909)

External links

Stewards of the Dells of the Wisconsin River
Down and Out in a Repurposed Troop Carrier

Driftless Area
Protected areas of Adams County, Wisconsin
Protected areas of Columbia County, Wisconsin
Protected areas of Juneau County, Wisconsin
Protected areas of Sauk County, Wisconsin
Rock formations of Wisconsin
State Natural Areas of Wisconsin
Landforms of Adams County, Wisconsin
Landforms of Columbia County, Wisconsin
Landforms of Juneau County, Wisconsin
Landforms of Sauk County, Wisconsin
1994 establishments in Wisconsin
Protected areas established in 1994